Monsignor Bernardino Piñera Carvallo (22 September 1915 – 21 June 2020) was a Chilean bishop of the Roman Catholic Church.

Life
Born in Paris, France, Piñera was ordained a priest on 5 April 1947. He worked for the Catholic Action. On 11 February 1958, Pope Pius XII appointed Piñera Carvallo auxiliary bishop of Talca. Later, he was appointed Bishop of Temuco (1960–77) and Archbishop of La Serena (1983–90). From 1983 to 1988, he was president of the Episcopal Conference of Chile. Piñera Carvallo attended the Second Vatican Council from 1962 to 1965. He was the paternal uncle of Sebastián Piñera, the president of Chile.

Vatican sex abuse investigation
On 21 August 2019, Chile's nuncio Ivo Scapolo announced that the Vatican had launched an investigation into claims that Piñera sexually abused at least one child 50 years earlier. No charges were ever filed, however.

Death
Msgr Piñera died in Santiago on 21 June 2020, aged 104. Piñera had contracted COVID-19 a month earlier during the COVID-19 pandemic in Chile. Although the government initially denied the disease to be the cause of death, the certificate issued by the Civil Registry and Identification Service indicates "pneumonia due to COVID-19" as the cause. At the time of his death, he was the oldest Catholic bishop in the world, and the last surviving bishop appointed by Pius XII.

References

External links 
 Catholic Hierarchy

1915 births
2020 deaths
20th-century Roman Catholic bishops in Chile
French emigrants to Chile
20th-century Roman Catholic archbishops in Chile
Clergy from Paris
Bernardino
Participants in the Second Vatican Council
Chilean centenarians
Deaths from the COVID-19 pandemic in Chile
Men centenarians
Roman Catholic bishops of Temuco
Roman Catholic archbishops of La Serena
Roman Catholic bishops of Talca